Airport Carbon Accreditation is a global carbon management programme for airports that independently assesses and recognises airports' efforts to manage and reduce their CO2 emissions. Aircraft emissions, which are many times greater than airport emissions, are not included in the programme. The airport industry accounts for 5% of the air transport sector’s total carbon emissions.

The programme was launched by European airports' trade body ACI EUROPE at their Annual Congress in June 2009. It is independently administered by WSP, an international consultancy firm. The programme provides airports with a common framework for active carbon management with measurable goal-posts. Individual airport carbon footprints are independently verified in accordance with ISO 14064 (Greenhouse Gas Accounting) on the basis of supporting evidence. Claims regarding airports' carbon management processes are also independently verified by a group of 117 independent verifiers, based in 36 countries.

4 Levels of the programme 
The 'Mapping' level of Airport Carbon Accreditation (Level 1) requires carbon footprint measurement.
The 'Reduction' level of Airport Carbon Accreditation (Level 2) requires carbon management and progress towards a reduced carbon footprint.
The 'Optimisation' level of Airport Carbon Accreditation (Level 3) requires third party engagement in carbon footprint reduction. Third parties include airlines and various service providers, for example, independent ground handlers, catering companies, air traffic control and others working on the airport site. It also involves engagement on surface access modes (road, rail) with authorities and users.
The 'Neutrality' level of Airport Carbon Accreditation (Level 3+) requires neutralising remaining direct carbon emissions by offsetting. The first airport to ever achieve carbon neutrality was the Stockholm-Arlanda Airport in Sweden.

Official endorsements 

The initiative is a direct consequence of the resolution on Climate Change adopted in June 2008 by the ACI EUROPE annual assembly, and has been endorsed by both the European Civil Aviation Conference and EUROCONTROL. The administration of Airport Carbon Accreditation is overseen by an independent Advisory Board, members of which include representatives of the United Nations Framework Convention for Climate Change (UNFCCC), United Nations Environment Programme (UNEP), European Civil Aviation Conference (ECAC), the European Commission, EUROCONTROL, Federal Aviation Administration (FAA) and Manchester Metropolitan University. On 30 November 2011 it was announced that the International Civil Aviation Organization (ICAO) was also formally supporting the programme, and taking a seat on the independent advisory board.

In addition to European Commission participation on the Advisory Board, the then European Commission Vice President responsible for Transport Siim Kallas has strongly supported the scheme, participating in the presentation of accreditation certificates at several European Airports, including Charles de Gaulle, Orly, Brussels and Budapest Airports. He has also stated that he believes the initiative is playing a crucial role in helping move European aviation onto a more sustainable footing.

Carbon standard Airport Carbon Accreditation going global 

The programme has expanded beyond Europe on 30 November 2011, having been formally extended to the Asia-Pacific region at ACI Airport Exchange conference in Abu Dhabi, organised by ACI ASIA-PACIFIC. The first airport to become accredited within this region was Abu Dhabi International Airport which achieved 'Mapping' level. Since then, 38 airports from the region joined the community of accredited airports. 
The programme was further extended with the African region of ACI joining the community in June 2013. The launch of Airport Carbon Accreditation in Africa was coupled with the official certification of the first African airport to the programme, Enfidha-Hammamet International Airport in Tunisia, which was certified at the 'Mapping' level. 
In June 2014, at ACI EUROPE's Annual Congress in Frankfurt the Airport Carbon Accreditation programme celebrated two important milestones in its story:  its 5th anniversary together with crossing the threshold of 100 airports participating in the programme.

Shortly thereafter, in fall 2014, the programme became global, with its official launch in North America, followed by its introduction in the region of Latin America and the Caribbean. Having already achieved significant results in 5 continents, the launch of Airport Carbon Accreditation in this region, in partnership with ACI Latin America & the Caribbean, marked the decisive moment when the programme became the global standard for carbon management at airports.

In 2015, a new interactive website – www.airportco2.org was launched at the end of Year 6 of Airport Carbon Accreditation – the year of the global expansion of the programme. This microsite was created to promote the programme in more accessible language and to communicate the annual results achieved by participating airports. It continues to present key figures from the programme, both globally and per region, in a more visual and engaging way.

Airport Carbon Accreditation at Paris Sustainable Innovation Forum (COP21) 

The COP21 Conference in Paris in December 2015 was an important milestone for the Airport Carbon Accreditation programme. On the occasion of its presentation at the Conference, the European airport industry committed to increasing the number of carbon neutral airports to 50 by 2030. Following the announcement of this commitment, ACI EUROPE and the carbon standard Airport Carbon Accreditation signed a partnership with the United Nations Framework Convention on Climate Change (UNFCCC), at a special side event. The partnership agreement committed ACI to supporting the UNFCCC's 'Climate Neutral Now' campaign, while the UNFCCC would support airport climate action at airports, with a particular focus on carbon management by airports through Airport Carbon Accreditation. The organisations agreed also to develop a common work programme and communications plan promoting carbon neutrality at airports.

European airports commit to 100 carbon neutral airports by 2030 
In June 2017, at ACI EUROPE's 27th Annual Congress, European airports made a new pledge, doubling the one made during COP21. They committed to 100 carbon neutral airports by 2030. Over 20 airport operator companies signed the new commitment, among which: Groupe ADP, AENA, Aeroporto di Bologna, Aeroport Brest Bretagne, Aeroports de la Côte d'Azur, Bristol Airport, Brussels Airport, Finavia, Heathrow Airport, London City Airport, Geneva Airport, Munich Airport, Aeroporto Internazionale di Napoli, Aeroport Quimper Bretagne, Schiphol Group and Zurich Airport.

Awards and recognition 

The Airport Carbon Accreditation programme has gathered a number of notable climate-action awards. In 2013, the programme reached Top 3 in the World You Like competition, a contest in which businesses, NGOs and local authorities can participate by showcasing their climate-friendly solutions, run by the European Commission's Directorate-General for Climate Action. The Airport Carbon Accreditation programme was chosen out of 269 low carbon projects in Europe – and the only transport project in the Top 3. It was recognised as an efficient and innovative climate solution that is making a real difference in helping airports address their CO2 emissions. 
In May 2014, the airport industry's efforts to address its carbon emissions received the Highly Commended prize at the annual global International Transport Forum (ITF) Awards issued by the Organisation for Economic Cooperation and Development (OECD). The voluntary climate change initiative Airport Carbon Accreditation was named as one of two runners-up for the ITF's Transport Achievement Award.

Only a month later, in June 2015, the animation "Life is about Movement", created to highlight the essence of the programme, was awarded the Gold Totem prize in the "Businesses & Eco-Performances" category at the 4th Deauville Green Awards 2015.

In 2016, Airport Carbon Accreditation was featured in the first ever European Aviation Environmental Report, published by the European Commission, in very positive terms as one of the innovative initiatives of the airport industry to tackle environmental challenges.

Current state of play 

As of 2017, 192 airports across the world are certified at one of the 4 levels of Airport Carbon Accreditation. These airports handle 2.7 billion passengers a year, 38.4% of global air passenger traffic. 35 airports are carbon neutral – the latest to reach this level was Helsinki Airport. There are now 28 carbon neutral airports in Europe, 5 in Asia, 1 in North America and 1 in Africa.

Europe 

In Europe, there are now 116 airports participating in the programme, 51 of which are at the top 2 levels of the programme. Helsinki Airport was the latest airports to reach carbon neutrality in the region. The other recent movers within the programme are Düsseldorf and Naples airports – each of which successfully make the jump from Level 2 Reduction, to Level 3 Optimisation. Madeira, Marseille and Porto Santo airports have moved up to Level 2 Reduction while Switzerland's Bern Airport became the latest newcomer in Europe, entering the programme at Level 1 Mapping.

Asia-pacific  

Delhi's Indira Gandhi International Airport was the first carbon neutral airport in Asia-Pacific region. There are now 38 carbon neutral airports with recent entrants including Gold Coast Airport and Hobart International (both in Australia) as well as Muscat International Airport and Nadi International Airport (Fiji) – which have all started their journey to active carbon management, becoming accredited at Level 1 Mapping. Mumbai International Airport and Bangalore International Airport are the latest airports to become carbon neutral in the region.

Africa

Recent months have seen several new airports come on board, nearly doubling the participation on the African continent. Cape Town International, King Shaka International (Durban), Port Elizabeth International and O.R. Tambo International (Johannesburg) – 4 airports in South Africa have all successfully entered the programme at Level 1 Mapping. This brings the total number of African airports in the programme up to 9.

Another key development was the successful upgrade of Felix Houphouet Boigny International Airport (Abidjan) to Level 3+ Carbon Neutrality. This is the first African airport to ever scale this high in the Airport Carbon Accreditation scheme.

North America 

It's been two and a half years since the programme was launched in North America, and 23 airports have become certified in this region. The latest entry was made by Van Nuys Airport. In all, the 23 certified airports in the North America region currently account for 32.6% of air passenger traffic in North America.

Latin America & caribbean 

There are currently 6 certified airports in the region of Latin American and Caribbean. The latest entrants are Guayaquil Airport in Ecuador and El Dorado Airport in Colombia. 4 of them at Level 1 Mapping, and the other 2 actively reducing their emissions, certified at Level 2 Reduction.

Counting the CO2 reduction 
Airport emissions have been reduced by 55,633 tonnes of CO2 in Year 1 of the programme and 55,501 tonnes in Year 2, and 77,782 tonnes in Year 3 as a result. Year 4 of the programme had a CO2 reduction of 110,003 tonnes - enough to power 45,949 households for a year.

If 31,894 cars were removed from the roads for one year, it would enable a reduction close to the one achieved by Airport Carbon Accreditation's participants in Year 5.

From July 2014 to June 2015, the programme has allowed a reduction comparable to the annual CO2 sequestered by 1,496 acres of forest. We could have powered almost twice as many households as compared to the year 4 result in the sixth consecutive year of the programme. Following years are bound to beat these figures, with a number of accredited airports at high levels rising.

References

External links 

 
  CNN World Report on Airport Carbon Accreditation

Aviation and the environment
Environmental standards